Miami Medical (formerly titled Miami Trauma) is an American medical drama television series that aired on CBS from April 2 to July 2, 2010. It follows the professional and private lives of a team of trauma surgeons.

The series was created by Jeffrey Lieber and produced by Jerry Bruckheimer Television and Warner Bros. Television.

On May 18, 2010, CBS cancelled the series after one season.

Cast and characters 
Matthew Procter, MD, FACS (Jeremy Northam)
 Matthew moved to Miami following a successful stint as a GI doctor in Maryland. His transfer was prompted by an accident that caused him to reconsider his life. He was unexpectedly appointed to the position of Chief of Trauma Team Alpha over veteran surgeon Eva Zambrano. He is an Attending Trauma Physician.

Eva Zambrano, MD, FACS (Lana Parrilla)
 Eva is an Attending Trauma Physician and the Deputy Chief of Trauma Team Alpha. Her father was a trauma surgeon in Cuba, but when they defected on a raft when Zambrano was six, his ego would not allow him to begin his career again as a resident. Despite being next-in-line to run Alpha Team, she is unexpectedly pitted-to-the-post by Procter.

Chris Deleo, MD, FACS (Mike Vogel)
 Chris, known as "C" to his colleagues, is three-years Eva's junior, though still felt he was a viable candidate for the vacant Chief position. During season one, he had been a member of Alpha for two-and-a-half years. He is Chief Resident.

Serena Warren, MD (Elisabeth Harnois)
 Serena is a resident assigned to the trauma surgery service, and as such is far more idealistic than her older colleagues. Warren often exhibits an inability to deliver bad news to patients. She is incredibly claustrophobic.

Tuck Brody, RN (Omar Gooding)
 Tuck is a Nurse assigned to Trauma. He is often seen giving emotional and moral support to patients, families, and doctors. During season one, Tuck is stabbed, though he later makes a full recovery.

Episodes

Ratings

Broadcasting 

In Germany, the show is set to premiere on sixx on July 22, 2011. In Poland, show will be broadcast on TV Puls from September 7, 2011.
In the Czech Republic, TV Nova will broadcast the show Monday - Friday afternoon from November 13, 2011. In Spain, the show was broadcast on TV3 on July 27, 2012. In Finland, show will be broadcast on MTV3 and AVA in the spring 2013. In Belgium, the show is set to premiere on VIJF on June 4, 2013.

See also
List of films and television shows set in Miami

References

External links

2010s American drama television series
2010s American medical television series
2010 American television series debuts
2010 American television series endings
CBS original programming
English-language television shows
Television series by Warner Bros. Television Studios
Television shows set in Miami